The 1895 Harvard Crimson football team represented Harvard University in the 1895 college football season. The Crimson finished with an 8–2–1 record. First-year head coach Robert Emmons led the team from October 21 to November 3. Following the team's 12–4 loss to Princeton, assistant Lorin F. Deland took over as head coach. He led the team to a 1–1–1 record in their last three games, including a 17–14 loss to Penn, the closest the undefeated Quakers came to defeat that year.

Schedule

References

Harvard
Harvard Crimson football seasons
Harvard Crimson football
19th century in Boston